Union Gap is a city in Yakima County, Washington, United States. As of the 2020 census, the city population was 6,568. Union Gap has become the retail hub for the entire Yakima Valley as a result of Valley Mall and other thriving businesses being located here. Part of the city is part of the Yakama Nation.

Name
The town is so named due to the small Yakima River water gap with which it shares its name, in the east–west ranging hill-line at 46.529N, 120.472W. Through this gap proceeds US 97 & I-82, Thorp road, the Yakima river, and Ahtanum creek.

History
The city of Union Gap was originally named Yakima City and was officially incorporated on November 23, 1883.  When bypassed by the Northern Pacific Railroad in December 1884, over 100 buildings were moved with rollers and horse teams to the nearby site of the depot. The new city was dubbed North Yakima.  In 1918 North Yakima was changed to simply Yakima, and the original town to the south was named Union Gap.

Geography
Union Gap is located at  (46.558237, -120.490566).

Economy
Liberty Bottleworks, a water bottle manufacturer, operates out of a plant in Union Gap that employs 18 people.

Demographics

2010 census
As of the census of 2010, there were 6,047 people, 2,061 households, and 1,420 families living in the city. The racial makeup of the city was 62.9% White, 0.9% African American, 2.6% Native American, 0.9% Asian, 29.1% from other races, and 3.6% from two or more races. Hispanic or Latino of any race were 47.2% of the population.

There were 2,061 households, of which 40.3% had children under the age of 18 living with them, 42.6% were married couples living together, 17.6% had a female householder with no husband present, 8.6% had a male householder with no wife present, and 31.1% were non-families. 23.5% of all households were made up of individuals, and 8.9% had someone living alone who was 65 years of age or older. The average household size was 2.90 and the average family size was 3.43.

The median age in the city was 32.7 years. 28.9% of residents were under the age of 18; 10.7% were between the ages of 18 and 24; 25.3% were from 25 to 44; 23.4% were from 45 to 64; and 11.8% were 65 years of age or older. The gender makeup of the city was 50.5% male and 49.5% female.

2000 census
As of the census of 2000, there were 5,621 people, 2,070 households, and 1,407 families living in the city. The population density was 1,117.7 people per square mile (431.5/km2). There were 2,210 housing units at an average density of 439.5 per square mile (169.6/km2). The racial makeup of the city was 72.19% White, 0.41% African American, 2.24% Native American, 0.57% Asian, 0.09% Pacific Islander, 20.17% from other races, and 4.32% from two or more races. Hispanic or Latino of any race were 29.57% of the population.

There were 2,070 households, out of which 33.8% had children under the age of 18 living with them, 46.7% were married couples living together, 14.3% had a female householder with no husband present, and 32.0% were non-families. 26.0% of all households were made up of individuals, and 10.4% had someone living alone who was 65 years of age or older. The average household size was 2.67 and the average family size was 3.20.

In the city, the age distribution of the population shows 28.5% under the age of 18, 9.4% from 18 to 24, 28.4% from 25 to 44, 20.4% from 45 to 64, and 13.3% who were 65 years of age or older. The median age was 33 years. For every 100 females, there were 99.4 males. For every 100 females age 18 and over, there were 97.3 males.

The median income for a household in the city was $30,676, and the median income for a family was $34,795. Males had a median income of $25,802 versus $23,393 for females. The per capita income for the city was $13,102. About 14.9% of families and 18.0% of the population were below the poverty line, including 24.2% of those under age 18 and 9.9% of those age 65 or over.

References

 City of Union Gap Web site
 History of Union Gap at HistoryLink
 Union Gap Tourism - the official tourism site for the City of Union Gap

Cities in Washington (state)
Cities in Yakima County, Washington
1918 establishments in Washington (state)
Populated places on the Yakima River
Water gaps of Washington